Anders Jacobsson may refer to:

Anders Jacobsson, a Swedish writer (see Anders Jacobsson and Sören Olsson)
Anders Jacobsson, a Swedish musician, vocalist in Draconian

See also
Anders Jacobsen (disambiguation)